Prachathippatai  ("Democracy") is the seventh album by Thai rock band Carabao. It was released in 1986.

Track listing

1986 albums
Carabao (band) albums